Bobby Singh, is an Australian tabla player. He was one of the musician responsible for the album Djan Djan which won the 2010 ARIA Award for Best World Music Album. Singh is also a member of Rasa Duende.
 
Djan Djan is an album by Mamadou Diabate, Bobby Singh & Jeff Lang. Diabate is a kora player and Lang is a guitarist. The three met during Diabate's 2008 tour of Australia and recorded the album in a single day in March of that year.

Singh was the subject of the documentary Viva, I Belong Everywhere that was broadcast nationally on SBS TV in May 2005.

Discography

Albums

Awards and nominations

ARIA Music Awards
The ARIA Music Awards is an annual awards ceremony that recognises excellence, innovation, and achievement across all genres of Australian music. They commenced in 1987.

! 
|-
| 2010
| Djan Djan  (with Mamadou Diabate and Jeff Lang)
| ARIA Award for Best World Music Album
| 
| 
|-

References

Australian musicians
Living people
Year of birth missing (living people)
ARIA Award winners